Acromares vittatum is a species of harvestman from the genus Acromares. This species was first described by Clarence J. Goodnight and Marie Louise Goodnight.

Description 
The Acromares vittatum is said to be similar to the Acromares roeweri. It differs by its dorsal color patterns and its leg spination.

Range 
The species has been recorded from numerous locations in Belize and in Yaxha, Guatemala.

Etymology 
Vittatum is an inflection from the Latin word "vittatus", which means banded or having a fillet.

References

Cosmetidae